Utricularia cheiranthos is a terrestrial carnivorous plant that belongs to the genus Utricularia (family Lentibulariaceae). It is endemic to the Northern Territory where it is only known from the type location near the Arnhem Land escarpment.

See also 
 List of Utricularia species

References 

Carnivorous plants of Australia
Flora of the Northern Territory
cheiranthos
Lamiales of Australia